The Pohjanmaa class is a series of four multi-role corvettes currently under development for the Finnish Navy as part of the Squadron 2020 project. Together with the existing four s, the four new surface combatants will form the backbone of the Finnish Navy from the mid-2020s onwards. They will replace seven older vessels that have been or are due to be decommissioned; the minelayer , two s and four s.

Design

General characteristics

Each ship will have a complement of about 70 officers and crew. Designed for year-round service in the seasonally freezing Baltic Sea, Pohjanmaa-class corvettes will feature an ice-strengthened hull and ability to operate independently in ice. Although no Finnish-Swedish ice class exists for military vessels, the ice capacity of the corvettes will be equivalent to that ice class 1A for merchant ships.

During normal patrol operations, the ship's twin ice-strengthened controllable pitch propellers are driven by electric propulsion motors. However, two of the four 12-cylinder MAN 12V175D type diesel generating sets are installed on double resilient mountings within soundproof enclosures to reduce noise and vibration during anti-submarine warfare (ASW) missions. For low-speed maneuvering, the ships are fitted with two bow thrusters.

Combat management system, communication system and sensors 

The combat management system (CMS) of the Pohjanmaa-class corvettes will be provided by the Swedish defence company Saab. The integrated communication system (ICS) TactiCall is provided by Saab.  Built around the 9LV CMS, the system will include Sea Giraffe 4A FF fixed-face AESA and Sea Giraffe 1X short-range 3D radars installed on a Saab Lightweight Integrated Mast (SLIM), two CEROS 200 fire control directors, TactiCall integrated communications system, and a laser warning system. Before final selection, the Finnish Navy shortlisted Saab together with Lockheed Martin Canada and Atlas Elektronik as the potential combat management system provider and integrator.

The underwater sensor suite will consist of Kongsberg's SS2030 active hull-mounted sonar and SD9500 lightweight over-the-side dipping sonar. In addition, Pohjanmaa-class corvettes will be equipped with Patria's lightweight dual-tow Sonac DTS that includes both an active variable-depth sonar as well as a passive towed receiving array.

Armament 

Pohjanmaa-class corvettes will be armed with a single dual-purpose naval gun, surface-to-surface and surface-to-air missiles, anti-submarine torpedoes, naval mines, close-in weapon systems, and a decoy system.

The forward-mounted Bofors 57 mm Mk3 dual-purpose main gun will be recycled from the s. In addition, each Pohjanmaa-class corvette will be fitted with two Saab Trackfire remote controlled weapon stations for close-in self-defence and four Rheinmetall Multi Ammunition Softkill System (MASS) decoy launchers.

The primary surface-to-surface armament of the Pohjanmaa class is the Gabriel 5 subsonic anti-ship missile. The latest version of Israel Aerospace Industries's anti-ship missile family was selected over Kongsberg's Naval Strike Missile, MBDA's Exocet, Boeing's Harpoon and Saab's RBS15. In Finnish Navy service, the missile system will be referred to as PTO2020 (Pintatorjuntaohjus 2020, "surface defence missile").

Against aerial targets, Pohjanmaa-class corvettes will be armed with Raytheon RIM-162 Evolved Seasparrow Missile (ESSM) surface-to-air missiles. Each vessel will be capable of carrying a total of 32 missiles quad-packed to eight Mark 41 Vertical Launching System silos. In Finnish Navy service, the system will be referred to as ITO20 (Ilmatorjuntaohjus 20).

For underwater warfare, the vessels will be fitted with Saab Torped 47 lightweight anti-submarine torpedoes. In addition, Pohjanmaa-class corvettes will be able to lay naval mines.

Development and construction

The initial development of the new surface combatants for the Finnish Navy began with a research and planning phase in 2008 and the Squadron 2020 project was officially launched in 2015. The 647.6 million euro shipbuilding contract was awarded to the Finnish shipbuilder Rauma Marine Constructions in September 2019. In November 2021, the shipyard announced that it would need from 6 to 12 months additional time to complete the design. , the estimated delay has reportedly increased to 14 to 18 months.

According to the initial schedule, the construction of the four-strong class would be staggered over 2022–2025 and full operational status would be achieved in 2028. Due to delays, this has been postponed to 2029.

Naming

One of the Finnish Navy's traditions has been to name its major combat ships after regions in Finland. The name Pohjanmaa, which is the Finnish name for the region Ostrobothnia, has been used both by the Finnish and Swedish navies for previous ships and classes of ships, dating back to the 18th century with the first recorded vessel being Gamla Pojama ("Old Pohjanmaa"), that was launched in 1760, and the last one, being the minelayer/training vessel , which was sold in 2016. The aforementioned 18th century Pohjanmaa, alongside the  Hämeenmaa, Uusimaa and Turunmaa types were also the four main "archipelago frigate" types used in the 1790 Battle of Svensksund, which is one of the largest Finnish (Finland was a part of Sweden at the time) naval victories and the largest naval battle in the Baltic Sea to date.

Criticism

Classification 

While the Finnish Navy and the Ministry of Defence refer to the new surface combatants as multi-role corvettes, several commentators have pointed out that by displacement the  vessels should be classified as frigates. In late September 2019, shortly after the construction contract was awarded, MP Johannes Yrttiaho (Left Alliance) submitted a written question to the Parliament of Finland about, among other related topics, the classification of the new ships.

In the official blog of the Finnish Defence Forces, Flotilla admiral Jori Harju (Commander of the Finnish Navy) noted that one of the reasons leading to the increased displacement is the additional strengthening of the hull, propulsion shaft lines and propellers required for year-round operation in the seasonally freezing Finnish territorial waters. He also pointed out that the Pohjanmaa class is intended to operate primarily in coastal waters whereas frigates are traditionally considered as the smallest class of warships operating in the high seas as part of a so-called blue-water navy.

Size 

Until the planned commission of the new Pohjanmaa class, the largest surface combatants of the Finnish Navy remain the two s. Several commentators have criticized the Squadron 2020 program due to the size of the new corvettes: according to critics, the ships are too large for the often shallow Finnish territorial waters riddled with skerries as well as too attractive and large targets for Russian anti-ship missiles. Furthermore, it has been speculated that the ship size has been driven by their suitability for international missions rather than domestic defence needs and that the whole concept has been derived from the s operated by the United States Navy.

The Finnish Navy has argued that the size of the new ships is a result of combining multiple missions within a single hull. In particular, the ability to lay naval mines has been raised as one of the key features necessitating a larger vessel. Despite some similarities in external appearance to other naval ships, the new multi-role corvettes have been tailored for the Finnish Navy's missions in the Baltic Sea and thus represent a completely new vessel concept with no reference design in service anywhere in the world.

Notes

References

External links 
 Squadron 2020
 Squadron 2020 The Finnish Defence Forces' strategic project

Corvette classes
Ships of the Finnish Navy
Ships built in Finland
Proposed ships